Below is a List of Knights Grand Cross of the Order of the British Empire from the Order's creation in 1917 to the present day. The names and titles of recipients are given as at the time of their appointment or promotion to Knight Grand Cross. The date of the award, as given in the announcement The London Gazette, is included in brackets after the names.

List

1920s

1920 
 Division and date unknown

 Abdullah (honorary) (honorary)
 Prince Zeid bin Hussein (honorary)
 Ali of Hejaz (honorary)
 Frederic Courtland Penfield (honorary)

1922 
 Civil Division
José Evaristo Uriburu (date unknown)

1926 
 Military Division
 Admiral Sir Frederic Edward Errington Brock (5 June)
 Civil Division
 Lieutenant-General Sir Travers Clarke (19 January)
 The Lord Islington (5 June)
 Sir William Mackenzie (5 June)
 The Lord Queensborough (5 June)

1927 
 Military Division
 General Sir Noel Birch (9 December)
 Civil Division
 Sir Frank Heath (3 June)
 Lieutenant-Colonel Sir Samuel Hoare, Bt. (3 June)
 Sir Otto Niemeyer (3 June)
 Sir Richard Threlfall (3 June)
 Hilton Young (3 June)
 Sir Henry Strakosch (3 June)
 General The Earl of Cavan (27 June)
 Sir Rowland Blades, Bt. (27 September)
 Colonel The Maharaja of Kapurthala (29 November)
Hereditary Prince of Korea (30 September 1927)

1928 
 Civil Division
 Sir John Dewrance (4 June)
 Sir William Grenfell Max Muller (4 June)
 Brigadier-General Sir Henry Maybury (4 June)
 Sir John Oakley (4 June)
 The Lord Phillimore (7 August)
 Brigadier-General Sir William Horwood (2 November)
 Dr Luis Alberto de Herrera (honorary) (date unknown) (special ambassador)

1929 
 Military Division
 Air Vice-Marshal Sir Philip Game (1 January)

 Civil Division
 Sir Arthur Crosfield, Bt. (1 March)
 Sir Henry Dobbs (1 March)
 Sir William McLintock (1 March)
 Sir William Symington McCormick (1 March)
 Sir Arthur Duckham (3 June)
 Sir Francis Taylor (3 June)
 Sir Beilby Alston (3 June) 
 Sir Harold Bowden, Bt. (28 June)
 Sir Philip Cunliffe-Lister (28 June)
 Commander Bolton Eyres-Monsell (28 June)

1930s

1930 
 Military Division
 Admiral Sir Edward Bradford (1 January)
 Civil Division
 Antonio Chiaramonte Bordonaro (honorary) (25 March) (invested by Arthur Henderson)
 Division and date unknown
 Ras Kassa Darge (honorary)

1931 
 No appointments were made in 1931.
General Blanco Galindo (19 February 1931)

1932 
 Civil Division
 Sir Robert Gibson (3 June)
 Division and date unknown
 The Crown Prince of Ethiopia (honorary)
 Prince Faisal of Saudi Arabia (honorary)

1933 
 No appointments were made in 1933.

1934 
 Military Division
 Admiral Sir Howard Kelly (1 January)
 Civil Division
 Sir Alan Anderson (4 June) 
 Sir John Reith (4 June)  
 Colonel Malik Sir Umar Hayat Khan (4 June)
 Division and date unknown
 Bahadur Shamsher Jang Bahadur Rana (honorary)

1935 
 Military Division
 General Sir Felix Ready (3 June)
 Civil Division
 Sir George Newman (3 June)
 Edward Beatty (3 June)
 Sir Ibrahim Rahimtoola (3 June)
 The Sultan of Johore (honorary) (3 June)
 The Sultan of Zanzibar (honorary) (3 June)
 Sir Stephen Killik (27 September)

1936 
Civil Division
Sir Sidney Barton (1 January)
1937: Archibald Rice Cameron, Frederic Dreyer, Sir Ernest Strohmenger, Kaiser Shumsher Jang Bahadur Rana (honorary)
1938: Sir Andrew Duncan, Carl Gustaf Emil Mannerheim (honorary [29 September]; removed 194?), The Earl of Onslow
1939: Frank Edward Smith

1940s
1941: Frederick Bowhill, Reginald Dorman-Smith, Thomas Gardiner, The Viscount Nuffield, Arthur Robinson, The Lord Rushcliffe, 1st Baron Wilson 
1942: Charles Little, 1st Baron Riverdale
1943: Prince of Berar, Thomas Blamey, Henry Hallett Dale, Edgar Ludlow-Hewitt, Percy Noble, William Platt, William Charles Wright 
1944: Cowasji Jehangir, 2nd Baronet, Allan Powell, 1st Baron Salter
1945: Vijayaraji Khengarji Sawai Bahadur, Christopher Courtney, The Viscount Finlay, Ernest Gowers, 1st Baronet Lithgow, Maharana Shri Vijayasinhji Chhatrasinhji, Maharaja of Rajpipla, Alexandros Papagos (honorary; presented 3 August), Vasily Sokolovsky (honorary), Harold R. Stark (honorary)
1946: 1st Baron Alness, Edward Appleton, Thomas Barlow, Muhammad Ahmad Said Khan Chhatari, Douglas Evill, Henry French, Alexander Hood, Maurice Holmes, Harold Howitt, Hubert Huddleston, 1st Baron Iliffe, John Kennedy, Arthur Power, Charles Kennedy-Purvis, Henry Peat, Thomas Williams Phillips, Hubert Rance, Bernard Rawlings, Edgar Stanley Roper, James Somerville, 1st Viscount Slim, 1st Baronet Thomson, Maharaja of Tripura
1947: John Chancellor, William Currie, Geoffrey Layton, George Sansom, 3rd Baronet Sassoon, Winthrop W. Aldrich (honorary)
1948: 4th Baronet Christison, Guy Garrod, Edward Mellanby, Sir Cyril Radcliffe, Reginald Leeper, John Waddington
1949: Robert Howe, Wilson Jameson, Walter Moberly, Sir Brian Robertson, Bt.

1950s
1950: Robert Burnett, Ralph Cochrane, 6th Earl of Ilchester, Donald Gainer, 1st Baron Silsoe, 1st Baronet Stewart of Strathgarry
1951: Patrick Brind, 28th Earl of Crawford, Lord Porter, Neil Ritchie, Dirk Stikker (honorary)
1952: Leslie Hollinghurst, Henry Mack
1953: Siddiq Abubakar III (honorary), Hilary Blood, 1st Baron Brabazon of Tara, The Duke of Edinburgh, Alvary Gascoigne, Cecil Harcourt, Alexander Knox Helm, 1st Baron Llewellin, Hugh Pughe Lloyd, 5th Earl of Limerick, Guy Russell, Frank Simpson, Charles Woolley
1954: 3rd Baron Aberdare, Idris I of Libya, John Wakeling Baker, 2nd Baronet Bowater, Gilbert Rennie, John Whitworth-Jones, Idris of Libya (honorary)
1955: 3rd Viscount Esher, Geoffrey Oliver, 1st Baron Rootes, John Troutbeck
1956: 9th Earl De La Warr, Miles Dempsey, 1st Baron Erskine of Rerrick, John Morison, Christopher Warner, John Whiteley, Juscelino Kubitschek (honorary)
1957: Nevil Brownjohn, 16th Earl of Dalhousie, Francis Evans, Francis Fogarty, Archibald Forbes, 1st Baron Hailes, Charles Keightley, Charles Pizey, Geoffrey Thompson, Lewis Williams Douglas (honorary)
1958: 1st Baron Citrine, Donald Hardman, Claude Pelly, Denis Truscott, Sir Harold Yarrow, Bt.
1959: John Balfour, 1st Viscount Kemsley, William Palmer, Frederick Parham

1960s
1960: 4th Baron Cottesloe, Gerald Gladstone, Ian Jacob, Sir Ivo Mallet, Cecil Sugden
1961: 5th Earl of Bandon, James Bowker, Ellis Hunter, William Luce, Ivan Stedeford
1962: Kenneth Blackburne, Hector Hetherington, Oscar Morland
1963: Colville Deverell, Walter Merton, Harold Pyman, 10th Earl of Selkirk, Geoffrey Wallinger, Wilfrid Woods
1964: Arthur fforde, James Harman, George Labouchere, Roderick McLeod
1965: Walter Cheshire, Alexander Gordon, James Miller, William Oliver
1966: Robert Bray, Lionel Denny, Alfred Earle, John Graham Hamilton, Hugh Stephenson
1967: John Anderson, Robert Bellinger, Alexander Bustamante, Leslie O'Brien
1968: The Duke of Norfolk, Nigel Henderson, Gilbert Inglefield
1969: Kenneth Darling, Charles Gairdner, Sir Louis Gluckstein, Arthur Kirby, David Lee, Charles Trinder

1970s
1970: Ian Bowater, The Lord Thomson of Fleet
1972: Sir Edward Howard
1973: The Lord Martonmere, The Lord Cole
1974: Murray Fox, Jack Marshall, The Lord Shawcross
1975: Lindsay Ring, 3rd Baron Rothschild, Sir George Thomson Wishart Gallagher CBE, MBE [Balmoral]. 
1976: Hugh Bullock (honorary; first US citizen to receive this honour), Robin Gillett, Sir Murray MacLehose, Richard Ward, Alan Smith
1977: Robert Mark, Peter White, Peter Vanneck
1978: Peter Le Cheminant, Kenneth Cork, Ronald Davison
1979: Peter Gadsden, Yuet-keung Kan, The Earl St Aldwyn

1980s
1980: Hugh Beach, Ronald Gardner-Thorpe
1981: Robert Freer, Christopher Leaver
1982: Anthony Farrar-Hockley, John Fieldhouse, Anthony Jolliffe, Anthony Morton, Francis Vallat
1984: John Gingell, Alan Traill 
1985: Allan Davis, Frank Kitson
1986: David Rowe-Ham
1987:  (honorary), Joshua Hassan, Kenneth Newman, The Lord Plowden, Greville Spratt, 
1988: Kenneth Berrill, Christopher Collett, Taher al-Masri (honorary), Caspar Weinberger (honorary)
1989: Hugh Bidwell, Sze-yuen Chung, Thomas Eichelbaum, David Harcourt-Smith, Sir John Woodward

1990s
1990: Alexander Graham, Sir Richard Vincent, Sir Tasker Watkins
1991: Jeremy Black, Sir Patrick Hine, Brian Jenkins
1992: Francis McWilliams, Anthony Skingsley
1993:
1994: Sir Kenneth Eaton
1995: Ion Caramitru
1996:
1997: The Lord Keith of Kinkel, Sir John Willis,
1998: The Lord Rothschild, Sir William Wratten
1999: Sir Peter Abbott, Sir Stephen Brown, George J. Mitchell (honorary)

2000s
2000: Edward George, Baron George
2002: Sir Anthony Bagnall, Sir Michael Perry, Sir Ronald Waterhouse Sir Ronnie Flanagan
2004: Sir Cyril Julian Hebden Taylor
2007: Sir David Cooksey, Sir Timothy Granville-Chapman

2010s
2011: Baron King of Lothbury, The Earl of Selborne, The Lord Weidenfeld
2012: Sir John Parker
2013: Sir Alan Budd, Sir Keith Mills

2014 
 Civil Division
Sir John Bell (31 December)
 Ratan Tata (honorary) (date unknown)

2015 
 Military Division
 Air Chief Marshal Sir Stuart Peach (31 December)

2016 
 Civil Division
 Sir Ian Wood (11 June)
 Sir Cyril Chantler (31 December)

2017 
Civil Division
Sir Michael Rawlins (17 June) 
Sir David Weatherall (17 June)
Sir Keith Peters (30 December)

2018 
Civil Division
Sir Craig Reedie (9 June)
Sir Christopher Greenwood (9 June)

2019
Civil Division
Sir Michael John Burton

2020s

2021 
Civil Division
The Earl Howe  (12 June)

2022 
Civil Division
Sir Partha Dasgupta  (31 December)

Unknown 

 Raul Regis de Oliveira
 Don Agustin Edwards (1927 or before)
 Saud of Saudi Arabia
Edward Bernard Raczyński (19? December 1991)
Agustín Pedro Justo Rolón
Juan Carlos Blanco (1926)
Gabriel Terra (1931) (on the occasion of the Prince of Wales' visit)
Jorge Matte Gormaz
General Carlos Ibáñez del Campo

See also
List of Knights and Ladies of the Garter
List of Knights and Ladies of the Thistle
List of Knights Grand Cross of the Order of the Bath
List of Knights and Dames Grand Cross of the Order of St Michael and St George

References

Burke's Peerage & Gentry, 107th edition

 
British Empire